Gianair is a Ghanaian airline with its head office in Accra, Ghana, and its main base at Kotoka International Airport in Accra.

History 

Gianair was incorporated on 29 May 2009 and commenced flight operations in April 2010. The airline specialises in executive and private charter, emergency medical rescue and ad hoc cargo operations. 

Gianair also manages Obuasi Airport on behalf of the owners, Anglo Gold Ashanti.

Fleet 

The Gianair fleet consists of the following aircraft (as of March 2021):
 2 BAe Jetstream 32

Destinations
Gianair operates the following scheduled services as of March 2021. 

 Accra – Kotoka International Airport
 Obuasi - Obuasi Airport

References 

Airlines of Ghana
Airlines established in 2009
Ghanaian companies established in 2009